Alain Berthoz (born 18 February 1939 in Neuilly-sur-Seine) is a French engineer and neurophysiologist.

He graduated from the elite engineering École Nationale Supérieure des Mines de Nancy (N60), (or Nancy School of Mines), and has been a member of the French Academy of Sciences since 2003, and the Academy of Technology since 2010. He is an honorary professor at the Collège de France.

Biography 
As a neurophysiologist, Berthoz is one of the leading specialists in integrative physiology. His research has focused on multisensory control of gaze, balance, locomotion and spatial memory.

Diplomas and career paths 

    Civil Engineer of the Mines of Nancy (1963)
    Doctor of Natural Sciences (1973) (Paris)
    Director of the Neurosensory Physiology Laboratory of the CNRS.
    Professor at the Collège de France (1993-2009)

Bibliography (not exhaustive) 

    Notice A. Berthoz[archive] on the BnF website
    Le Sens du mouvement, Éd. Odile Jacob, 1997
    The Decision, Ed. Odile Jacob, 2003
    L'Empathie, Éditions Odile Jacob, 2004,, under the direction of Alain Berthoz and Gérard Jorland
    Phénoménologie et physiologie de l'action, Alain Berthoz, Jean-Luc Petit, Odile Jacob, 2006
    La simplexité, Éd. Odile Jacob, 2009
    La Vicariance, le cerveau créateur de monde, Éd. Odile Jacob, 2013
    Complexity-Simplexity, Alain Berthoz (dir.) and Jean-Luc Petit (dir.), Collège de France (Conférences), 2014, DOI:10.4000/books.cdf.3339 - "volume "companion" of La simplexité

Contributions

    Preface to Ombre à n dimensions by Stéphane Sangral, Éd. Galilée, 2014
    Regards sur le sport, collective, directed by Benjamin Pichery and François L'Yvonnet, Le Pommier/INSEP 2010, 256 p.

Honours and awards

Distinctions 

    Elected member of the International Academy of Astronautics (1994)
    Elected member of the Academia Europaea (1994)
    Correspondent member of the French Academy of sciences (Paris, 1999) and member in 2003

Awards and medals 

    Silver medal of the National Centre for Space Studies (1985)
    La Caze Prize of the French Academy of sciences (Paris, 1987)
    General Prize of the Academy of Medicine (Paris, 1991)
    Daw Award for Neuroscience (USA, 1996)
    International Prize for Neurology of the University of Pavia (1998)
    Grand Prix du CEA of the French Academy of sciences (Paris, 1998)

References

1939 births
People from Neuilly-sur-Seine
French neuroscientists
Neurophysiologists
Collège de France
Members of the French Academy of Sciences
Living people